In the Hebrew Bible, the destroying angel (malʾāḵ hamašḥīṯ), also known as mashḥit ( mašḥīṯ, 'destroyer'; plural: , mašḥīṯīm, 'spoilers, ravagers'), is an entity sent out by YHWH on several occasions to kill the enemies of the Hebrews.

These angels (mal'akh) are also variously referred to as memitim ('executioners, slayers'), or Angel of the Lord. The latter is found in Job 33:22, as well as in Proverbs 16:14 in the plural, "messengers of death". Mashchith was also used as an alternate name for one of the seven compartments of Gehenna.

In 2 Samuel 24:15-16, the destroying angel kills the inhabitants of Jerusalem. In I Chronicles 21:15, the same "Angel of the Lord" is seen by David to stand "between the earth and the heaven, with a drawn sword in his hand stretched out against Hebrews's enemies". Later, in II Kings 19:35, the angel kills 185,000  Assyrian soldiers.

In the Book of Enoch, angels of punishment and destruction belong to a group of angels called satans with Satan as their leader. First they tempt, then accuse and finally punish and torment, both wicked humans and fallen angels.

In Judaism, such angels might be seen as created by one's sins. As long as a person lives, God allows him to repent. However, after death, the angels of destruction are allowed to execute the sentence proclaimed in the heavenly court.

See also
 Abaddon
 Azrael
 Punishment of the Grave
 Dumah (angel)
 Death (personification)
 List of angels in theology
 Mastema
 Mot
 Samael
 Zabaniyah

References

External links
 Jewish Encyclopedia Angel of Death
 Samael, Lilith, and the Destroyer

Death
Angels of death
Angels in Christianity
Angels in Judaism
Classes of angels